Ann-Kathrin Lindner (born 29 November 1987) is a German professional golfer. She played on the Ladies European Tour and won the Honma Pilsen Golf Masters in 2013.

Amateur career
Lindnder represented Golf Club St. Leon-Rot and was a member of the German National Team from 2010. In 2011 she was runner-up at the European Ladies Club Trophy in Crete, and again at the German National Championship. In 2012 she was runner-up at the German National Amateur behind Karolin Lampert.

Professional career
Lindner turned pro after securing a tour card at the LET Qualifying School in December 2012. In her rookie season she was runner-up at the Dinard Ladies Open in the LET Access Series in April, and won her maiden LET title in August, the Honma Pilsen Golf Masters in Czech Republic.

In 2014 she enjoyed top-10 finishes at the Ladies Slovak Open (T5), Ladies Scottish Open (solo 10th) and South African Women's Open (T4). By 2017 she made only three LET cuts and retired from tour.

Professional wins (1)

Ladies European Tour (1)

References

External links

Ann-Kathrin Lindner at the World Amateur Golf Ranking official site

German female golfers
Ladies European Tour golfers
Sportspeople from Hanover
1987 births
Living people
21st-century German women